Jaime Ayala Jain (born 16 September 1990 in Uruapan, Michoacán) is a Mexican professional footballer who plays as a midfielder.

References

1990 births
Living people
Footballers from Michoacán
Mexican footballers
People from Uruapan
Association football defenders
FC Tulsa players
Cruz Azul footballers
Mexican expatriate footballers
Expatriate soccer players in the United States
Mexican expatriate sportspeople in the United States